Koeberg Commando was a light infantry regiment of the South African Army. It formed part of the South African Army Infantry Formation as well as the South African Territorial Reserve.

History

Origin
Bellville Commando was renamed Durbanville Commando in 1964 and subsequently Koeberg Commando in 1969. The unit was finally renamed Koeberg Battalion in 1984.

With the SADF
During this era, the unit was mainly involved in area force protection, cordones and search operations assisting the local police.

This unit resorted under the command of Group 1.

With the SANDF

Disbandment
This unit, along with all other Commando units was disbanded after a decision by South African President Thabo Mbeki to disband all Commando Units. The Commando system was phased out between 2003 and 2008 "because of the role it played in the apartheid era", according to the Minister of Safety and Security Charles Nqakula.

Unit Insignia

Leadership

References

See also 
 South African Commando System

Infantry regiments of South Africa
South African Commando Units
Disbanded military units and formations in Cape Town